Şırnak is a city in Şırnak District and the capital of Şırnak Province in Turkey. The Ibrahim Khalil border crossing with Iraq is one of the main links of Turkey to Kurdistan Region in Iraq.

The city is mainly populated by Kurds of the Şirnexî tribe and had a population of 67,662 in 2021.

Neighborhoods 
Şırnak is divided into the twelve neighborhoods of Aşağıhan, Atatürk, Aydınlar, Bahçelievler, Boğaz, Cadırlı, Çavuşhan, Hatipler, Nasırhan, Şafak, Yayla and Yeni.

Modern history

Kurdish-Turkish conflict

1992 Turkish military operation 

On 18 August 1992, fighting broke out between Turkish security forces and Kurdish separatists of the PKK. 20,000 out of 25,000 residents fled the city during the three days of fighting.

While the town was under bombardment, there was no way to get an account of what was happening in the region as journalists were prevented from entering the city centre, which was completely burned down by the security forces. Şırnak was under fire for three days and tanks and cannons were used to hit buildings occupied by civilians.

2016 Turkish military operation 
On 13 March 2016 military operations by Turkish security forces began against PKK. The military curfew imposed on the Kurdish city was lifted after 246 days. Neighbourhoods like Gazipaşa, Yeşilyurt, İsmetpaşa, Dicle, Cumhuriyet and Bahçelievler were completely destroyed in the war.

Politics
In local elections of 2019, candidate Mehmet Yarka of the AKP party won with 61.72% of the vote.

Climate
Şırnak has a hot-summer Mediterranean (Köppen: Csa), or an exceptionally warm continental climate (Trewartha: Dc) with chilly, snowy winters and very hot, dry summers. Humidity is always low throughout the year due to its inland location. February and March are the wettest months, July and August are the driest, with virtually no precipitation at all.

References

 
Populated places in Şırnak Province
Kurdish settlements in Şırnak Province